The Old Highway 16 Bridge is a historic closed-spandrel arch bridge near Edgemont, Arkansas.  It carries an unused old alignment of Arkansas Highway 16 across the manmade "Edgemont Cut", an excavation made in 1908 during construction of the now-abandoned Missouri and North Arkansas Railroad.  The bridge was built in 1936 with funding from the Works Progress Administration, and remained in regular service until 1963, when Highway 16 was realigned.  In that year, the United States Army Corps of Engineers moved the road north to its present alignment, filling in part of the old railway cut.  The bridge is subject to flooding during exceptionally high water events in Greers Ferry Lake.

The bridge was listed on the National Register of Historic Places in 2011.

See also
National Register of Historic Places listings in Cleburne County, Arkansas
List of bridges on the National Register of Historic Places in Arkansas

References

Road bridges on the National Register of Historic Places in Arkansas
Arch bridges in the United States
National Register of Historic Places in Cleburne County, Arkansas
Transportation in Cleburne County, Arkansas
1936 establishments in Arkansas
1908 establishments in Arkansas
Bridges completed in 1936
Works Progress Administration in Arkansas